Black band or Blackband may refer to:

 Black (Bangladeshi band), a Bangladeshi rock band
 Black armband, a signifier that the wearer is in mourning
 Black Band (landsknechts), a formation of 16th century mercenaries
 Black Band (resistance group), a German anarcho-syndicalist paramilitary organization
 Black band disease, a coral disease
 Black Bands, a company of Italian mercenaries formed and commanded by Giovanni de' Medici during the Italian Wars
 Blackband, Ohio, an unincorporated community in Tuscarawas County

See also
 Black Hand (disambiguation)